William Lindsay (10 December 1872 – 27 February 1933) was an English professional footballer. He played in the Football League for Everton, Grimsby Town and Newcastle United, as well as the Southern League for Luton Town and Watford, and captained the latter four clubs. During his first season at Watford, he was part of the team that won promotion as champions of the 1903–04 Southern League Second Division.

Lindsay's brother, Jimmy, was also a footballer who played for Bury against Derby County in the 1903 FA Cup Final; Bury won 6–0.

References

1872 births
1933 deaths
Footballers from Stockton-on-Tees
Footballers from County Durham
English footballers
Association football fullbacks
Stockton F.C. players
Everton F.C. players
Grimsby Town F.C. players
Newcastle United F.C. players
Luton Town F.C. players
Watford F.C. players
Hitchin Town F.C. players
English Football League players
Southern Football League players